Tom Crowson, American politician, was a candidate for the United States House of Representatives.  He ran as a Republican in the Third Congressional District of Washington against incumbent Democrat Brian Baird. He is from Olympia, Washington.

Crowson won the primary for his party's nomination on 14 September 2004.  He then faced Baird in the general election on 2 November 2004, losing with 38% of the vote to Baird's 62%.  Crowson is running again in 2006.

External links
 campaign website

Living people
Washington (state) Republicans
People from Olympia, Washington
Year of birth missing (living people)